Churchill Falls Airport  is owned and operated by Churchill Falls Labrador Corporation Limited. Provincial Airlines provides regularly scheduled passenger service at the airport, which handled about 1,400 passengers annually over between 2000 and 2003.

Four small structures are the only buildings, as the airport has no formal terminal.

Airlines and destinations

Historical airline service

The airport had scheduled passenger jet service during the 1970s operated by Eastern Provincial Airways (EPA) with nonstop Boeing 737-200 jetliner flights to Goose Bay and Wabush with connecting service to Halifax and other cities in eastern Canada.  In 1970, EPA was operating round trip 737 service six days a week on a routing of St. John's - Gander - Deer Lake - Goose Bay - Churchill Falls - Wabush - Montreal.

Quebecair was serving the airport with BAC One-Eleven jets in 1972 with a round trip routing of Churchill Falls - Wabush - Sept-Iles - Quebec City - Montreal operated twice a week.  Quebecair also served Churchill Falls with Fairchild F-27 turboprop aircraft during the late 1960s and early 1970s.

References

Transport Canada article

External links
Page about this airport on COPA's Places to Fly airport directory

Certified airports in Newfoundland and Labrador